Marie-Jeanne Bardot (born 5 May 1938), known professionally as Mijanou Bardot, is a French actress and writer. She starred in the 1960 film Sex Kittens Go to College with Mamie van Doren and Tuesday Weld.

She is married to Patrick Bauchau and they have a daughter, Camille. She lives in Los Angeles. She is the younger sister of Brigitte Bardot.

Filmography 
 1956 – Women's Club
 1957 – Jusqu'au dernier (Until the Last One)
 1958 – C'est la faute d'Adam (It's All Adam's Fault)
 1958 – Il pirata dello sparviero nero (The Pirate of the "Black Hawk")
 1958 – Pecados Pagos com Sangue (Sins Paid with Blood)
 1958 – A Bullet in the Gun Barrel
 1959 – Ramuntcho
 1960 – Sex Kittens Go to College
 1967 – La Collectionneuse (The Collector)
 1968 – Después del diluvio (After the Flood)

References 

1938 births
20th-century French actresses
French film actresses
Living people
Actresses from Paris
French emigrants to the United States
Brigitte Bardot